Arielia mitriformis is a species of sea snail, a marine gastropod mollusk in the family Mitromorphidae.

Description

Distribution
This species occurs in the Pacific Ocean off the Galapagos Islands and in the Sea of Cortez, Western Mexico

References

External links
 Shasky, Donald R. "New deep water mollusks from the Gulf of California." The Veliger 4.1 (1961): 18–21
 

mitriformis
Gastropods described in 1961